Christian Theodor Kjelder Rasmussen (born 19 January 2003) is a Danish professional footballer who plays as a forward for Dutch clubs Ajax and Jong Ajax.

Professional career
Rasmusen is a youth product of Nordsjælland, having joined as a U12. On 6 February 2019, Rasmussen signed a contract with Ajax. Rasmussen made his professional debut with Jong Ajax as a late sub in a 4-0 Eerste Divisie loss to Roda on 30 August 2020.

Rasmussen made his Eredivisie debut for the senior squad of Ajax on 8 January 2023 in a game against NEC.

References

External links
 
 DBU Profile

2003 births
Sportspeople from the Capital Region of Denmark
People from Kongens Lyngby
Living people
Danish men's footballers
Denmark youth international footballers
Association football forwards
Jong Ajax players
AFC Ajax players
Eerste Divisie players
Eredivisie players
Danish expatriate men's footballers
Danish expatriates in the Netherlands
Expatriate footballers in the Netherlands